Rugby Leonessa 1928 is a former Italian rugby union club based in Brescia, Lombardy.

The team was formed in 2001 after the merger of A.S. Rugby Brescia and Rugby Rovato. Rugby Brescia was founded as XV Legione Leonessa d’Italia in 1928, while Rovato was founded in 1976.

The newly merged team, coached by Mathew Vaea and Frank Bunce, started in Serie A gaining the promotion to Super 10 with a record number of points (111 points) and 19 straight wins. In the 2003–04 season they played in Super 10 (now Top12), but were relegated the following 2004–05 season, under the technical guide of Lynn Howells.

In 2008 the club was disbanded while Rugby Brescia and Rugby Rovato went their separate ways.

Honours
 Italian championship
 Champions (1): 1974–75 (as Rugby Brescia)

Notable former players
 Kris Burton
 Massimo Cuttitta
 Alberto Di Bernardo
 Ignacio Fernández Rouyet
 Alberto Di Bernardo
 Rima Wakarua

Italian rugby union teams
Brescia
Sport in Lombardy